Jerrol Garcia-Williams (born December 24, 1993) is a former American football linebacker. He played college football at Hawaii.

Early life
Garcia-Williams attended Palo Verde High School in Las Vegas, finishing with 84 tackles, seven sacks, two interceptions and two forced fumbles as a senior.

College career
Garcia-Williams appeared in 45 games (26 starts) at the University of Hawaii, totaling 222 tackles (148 solo), 3.5 sacks, one pass defensed and three fumble recoveries. He saw action in 10 games (3 starts) as a redshirt senior, posting 31 tackles (24 solo). He started 9-of-10 games played as a junior, finishing second on the team with 89 tackles (55 solo) in addition to recording 1.5 sacks. Garcia-Williams started the first two games of the season in 2014 before suffering a season-ending knee injury and earning a medical redshirt.

Professional career
Garcia-Williams signed with the Denver Broncos as an undrafted free agent on May 11, 2017. He was waived by the Broncos on September 2, 2017 and was signed to the practice squad the next day. He was promoted to the active roster on October 21, 2017. He appeared in 11 games, posting one solo tackle and one special-teams stop.

On March 13, 2018, Garcia-Williams was tendered by the Broncos. On April 23, he signed the exclusive rights tender. On August 28, 2018, he suffered a torn ACL on the practice field and was ruled out for the season. He was placed on injured reserve on September 1, 2018. On March 7, 2019, The Broncos decided not tender linebacker Jerrol Garcia-Williams.

Personal
His father, Jerrol Williams, was an NFL linebacker with Pittsburgh (1989–92), San Diego (1993), Kansas City (1994) and Baltimore (1996).

References

External links
Hawaii Rainbow Warriors bio
Denver Broncos bio

1993 births
Living people
American football linebackers
Sportspeople from Las Vegas
Players of American football from Nevada
Players of American football from Ohio
Hawaii Rainbow Warriors football players
Denver Broncos players
People from Wooster, Ohio